Drăgănești may refer to:

Drăgănești-Olt, a town in Olt County, Romania
Drăgănești-Vlașca, a commune in Teleorman County, Romania
Drăgănești, Bihor, a commune in Bihor County, Romania
Drăgănești, Galați, a commune in Galaţi County, Romania
Drăgănești, Neamț, a commune in Neamț County, Romania
Drăgănești, Prahova, a commune in Prahova County, Romania
Drăgănești, a village in Andrieșeni Commune, Iași County, Romania
Drăgănești, a district in Brezoi town, Vâlcea County, Romania
Drăgănești, a village in Golești Commune, Vâlcea County, Romania
Drăgănești, Sîngerei, a commune in Sîngerei district, Moldova

See also
Drăgănescu (disambiguation)
Drăgan (disambiguation)